Mehmet Karadağ (born 10 July 1956) is a Turkish former wrestler who competed in the 1984 Summer Olympics.

References

External links
 

1956 births
Living people
Olympic wrestlers of Turkey
Wrestlers at the 1984 Summer Olympics
Turkish male sport wrestlers